Jörgen Olsson may refer to:

 Jörgen Olsson (orienteer) (born 1971), Swedish orienteer
 Jörgen Olsson (wrestler) (born 1968), Swedish Greco-Roman wrestler
 Jörgen Olsson (badminton) (born 1976), Swedish badminton player